"White Hidden Fire" is a song written and performed by the American psychedelic rock band Weird Owl, from their 2007 EP Nuclear Psychology. The track is one of Weird Owl's most well-known songs, and has been noted for its "catchy and chill out atmosphere".

Personnel
Weird Owl
 Trevor Tyrrell – guitar, lead vocals
 Jon Rudd – guitar
 Kenneth Cook – bass guitar, keyboards, synths, back-up vocals
 Sean Reynolds – drums
 John Cassidy – keyboards, synths

Additional production
 Gerard Garone – recording
 Harley Zinger – recording

References

2007 songs
American psychedelic rock songs